Claud Farie, sometimes spelled Claude Farie (5 December 1816 – 22 August 1870) was sheriff and politician in colonial Victoria, a member of the Victorian Legislative Council.

Early life
Farie was born in Farme, near Glasgow, Scotland, the son of James Farie and his wife Jane, née Scott.

Colonial Australia
Farie arrived in the Port Phillip District in January 1840. He was made Sheriff of Victoria on 2 November 1852.

In April 1854, Farie was elected to the unicameral Victorian Legislative Council for Villiers and Heytesbury. He held this position until resigning in October 1855.

Farie was inspector-general of penal establishments in 1869; captain commanding the Southern Rifles (formerly Prahran and South Yarra Rifle Corps) 1863–1869 and Pentridge Rifle Corps in 1869. He was also president of the Melbourne Club in 1854.

Farie died at his residence in Coburg, Victoria on 22 August 1870; he had married Jane Cox on 18 December 1845 in Launceston, Tasmania.

References

 

1816 births
1870 deaths
Members of the Victorian Legislative Council
Sheriffs of Victoria
Scottish emigrants to colonial Australia
Politicians from Glasgow
19th-century Australian politicians